KNCW (92.7 FM) is a radio station broadcasting a country music format. Licensed to Omak, Washington, United States, the station is currently owned by North Cascades Broadcasting, Inc. and features programming from Premiere Networks.

References

External links
 
 

Country radio stations in the United States
Radio stations established in 1980
NCW
1980 establishments in Washington (state)